Desmond John Anderson (born 17 October 1968) is a former first-class cricketer who played for Oxford University.
His highest score of 9 came in the match against Hampshire. His best bowling of 2/68 came in the match against Worcestershire.

References

English cricketers
Oxford University cricketers
Living people
1968 births
Alumni of St Edmund Hall, Oxford